Thermax Ltd is an Indian multinational engineering conglomerate, involved in clean air, clean energy and clean water, headquartered in Pune.

History 
Thermax manufactures boilers to harness the power of steam. The company started with producing small, once-through, "baby" boilers to cater to the steam requirements at hospitals. It was established in 1966, when A. S. Bhathena collaborated with a Belgian company, Wanson, to commence business operations in Dadar, Mumbai, India as Wanson India Ltd., manufacturing small boilers.

On 15 February 1995 it became a public company on the Bombay Stock Exchange. It has, since long, been known simply as Thermax Limited.

In 2009, it signed a 51–49 joint venture with US firm SPX Corporation to provide equipment and services for the Indian power sector.

In 2010, it signed a joint venture agreement with US-based Babcock & Wilcox to manufacture super-critical boilers for the power sector.

See also 
 List of boiler types, by manufacturer

References

Heating, ventilation, and air conditioning companies
Manufacturing companies established in 1980
Manufacturing companies based in Pune
Multinational companies headquartered in India
Engineering companies of India
Indian brands
Indian companies established in 1980
1980 establishments in Maharashtra
Companies listed on the National Stock Exchange of India
Companies listed on the Bombay Stock Exchange